10000 series may refer to:

Japanese train types
 Keihan 10000 series EMU, operated by Keihan Electric Railway
 Kintetsu 10000 series EMU
 Nankai 10000 series EMU
 Odakyu 10000 series HiSE EMU
 Seibu 10000 series EMU
 Sotetsu 10000 series EMU
 Tobu 10000 series EMU
 Toei 10-000 series EMU
 Tokyo Metro 10000 series EMU
 Tokyo Monorail 10000 series EMU
 Yokohama Municipal Subway 10000 series EMU